The TVR Tasmin (later known as the TVR 280i) is a sports car designed by Oliver Winterbottom (coach) and Ian Jones (chassis) for TVR and built in the United Kingdom by that company from 1980 to 1987. It was the first of TVR's "Wedge"-series which formed the basis of its 1980's model range. The Tasmin/280i was available as a 2-seater coupé, as a 2+2 coupé and as a 2-seater convertible.

History
 

The Tasmin was the first production car in the world to have both a bonded windscreen and also to incorporate the aerial in the rear screen heater element.  As with all TVRs, the running gear was located in a tubular spaceframe steel chassis which was powder coated for extra corrosion resistance. Much of the running gear was sourced from Fords of the period. The suspension and steering was sourced from the Ford Cortina, with TVR engineered trailing arms at the rear, similar to designs previously used on Lotus models including the early Esprit. Gearboxes were from the Cortina, Granada, and Sierra. Brakes were discs all round, with the front units from the Granada. The differential (and rear brakes) was from the Jaguar XJ-S. Ancillary components were sourced from a variety of mainstream manufacturers so it is possible to identify, for example, Ford Cortina external door handles; Triumph TR7 or Austin Metro internal handles; front side/indicator lamps by Lucas with those on later models taken from the Renault 12 and the Peugeot 505; rear lamp clusters from the Ford Capri, Rover SD1 or the Renault Fuego; boot lid hinges from the Hillman Imp and ex-Jaguar ashtrays (or on later cars the ashtray from the DeLorean DMC-12). The radiator was taken variously from the Ford Granada Mk2 and the Range Rover; front brakes could be ex-Granada in solid- or vented-disc form or the 4-piston calipers from the BL Princess (also a 'wedge' shaped car). The steering column and its associated switchgear changed over the years too: starting with the TR7 and proceeding through the Rover SD1, very late cars used the installation from the Ford Granada Mk3. The handbrake mechanism was that used on the Lotus Esprit. The headlamp pods were powered by individual motors lifted from the TR7/ Esprit. The original wheel design was specific to the Tasmin, being produced by Telcast in Telford. Later cars sported wheels from various makers including OZ. The seats were made by Callow & Maddox Brothers in Coventry, who also supplied other British car makers, hence the Tasmin seats appear similar to those used elsewhere but are in fact vehicle-specific, having a narrow but long base bolster. 

The engine was the Ford 2.8 Cologne V6 with Bosch fuel injection producing . An automatic gearbox was available, making it the first TVR to have this as an option. While the styling of the car was by Oliver Winterbottom who had previously styled the Lotus Elite S2. Beside the Cologne V6 engine the Tasmin was also available with a 2.0 litre Ford Pinto. This car, presented in late 1981, was called the Tasmin 200 and was an attempt to make a car cheaper than the standard Tasmin 280i. It was priced at under £10,000, but with an engine producing only about  it wasn't a big success. Only 16 Tasmin 200 coupes and 45 convertibles were made in total.

 In 1981 a series II car appeared, incorporating various improvements or modifications to the series I. These included a front suspension redesign, returning the tie-rods to the tension mode used by Ford rather than the compression mode into which TVR had initially installed them. This addressed frequent complaints of bump-steer. A bodyshell restyle also altered the proportions of the car (largely by tilting the previously-vertical glass tail panel) so it appeared shorter in the nose and longer at the rear; this coincided with the launch of the convertible/drophead version. In 1984 the Tasmin name was dropped and the car was renamed TVR 280i, although the name remained in use within the TVR factory. Early 350i's were also referred to as the "Tasmin 350i". TVR's consistently inconsistent badging policy resulted in the cars appearing as Tasmins, Tasmin 280is or just plain 280is as the Tasmin name was dropped.

The 2.8-litre "Cologne" V6 had already been certified for  US sales, and thus TVR returned to the US market after a six-year hiatus. The Tasmin was the last TVR to be exported to the United States, with the last car brought over in 1987, this being a series II 280i. A number of reasons are cited for TVR's withdrawal from the US. These allegedly include a deteriorating relationship with the import agents and the distribution network, warranty problems and liability insurance premiums rising from $160K to over $1M.

The Tasmin did not start out very strongly, with TVR production reaching a low of 121 in 1982. By 1985, yearly production had increased to 472. In total, 1,167 V6 cars were produced.

Specifications 

Tasmin 280i

Engine: Ford Cologne V6
Engine Capacity: 2792 c.c  (2,8 Litres)
Power Output:  (Series 1),  (series II)
Torque Output: 

Tasmin 200

Engine: Ford Pinto TL20 straight 4
Engine Capacity: 1993 cc (2.0 L)
Power Output: 
Torque Output: 

Transmission

Tasmin 200, 280i
Transmission: 4-spd Ford manual gearbox, 5-spd Ford manual gearbox, 3-spd Ford automatic gearbox

Suspension
Front: Double Wishbones
Rear: Semi trailing arms

Brakes

Front: Disc brakes
Rear: Disc brakes

Chassis/Body

Chassis: Tubular spaceframe steel chassis
Body: Fibreglass body panels

Performance

Tasmin 280i

Acceleration 0-: 8.0 seconds, 8.2 seconds (automatic gearbox)
Top Speed:  (Series 1), 

Weight

Weight: 

Tasmin 200

Acceleration 0- : 9.0 seconds
Top Speed: 

Weight

Weight:

References

External links
 Hemming Motor News feature on Martin Lilley
 Autoblog description of similar  Ital Design /Alfa Romeo Caimano concept car of 1971
 
 

Tasmin280
Sports cars
Rear-wheel-drive vehicles
Cars introduced in 1980
Cars discontinued in 1987